Subterinebrica albitaeniana is a species of moth of the family Tortricidae. It is found in Zamora-Chinchipe Province, Ecuador.

The wingspan is about 20 mm. The ground colour of the forewings is whitish with a yellowish-greenish hue. The hindwings are whitish with pale brownish spots in the apical third.

References

Moths described in 2008
Euliini